The Navy of the Islamic Revolutionary Guard Corps (officially abbreviated NEDSA, also known as the Sepah Navy and by the English acronym IRGCN) is the naval warfare service of the Islamic Revolutionary Guard Corps founded in 1985, and one of the two maritime forces of Iran, parallel to the conventional Islamic Republic of Iran Navy. The IRGC has been designated as a terrorist organization by the governments of Bahrain, Saudi Arabia and the United States.
IRGC's Navy has steadily improved its capabilities to support unconventional warfare and defend Iran's offshore facilities, coastlines, and islands in the Persian Gulf.

Name
The forces are known with their official abbreviation in Persian, "NEDSA". In maritime radio communications, it is addressed as "Sepah Navy".

History

Iran–Iraq War (1985–1988)

On 17 September 1985, Iran's supreme leader and commander-in-chief Ruhollah Khomeini ordered Islamic Revolutionary Guard Corps to create three branches including navy. Shortly afterwards, Hossein Alaei was appointed as the commander of the naval forces. The navy was tasked to operate in the Persian Gulf and by 1987 were able to play an active role against Iraqi Navy in the Iran–Iraq War.

During the "Tanker War" phase of the Iran–Iraq War, beside the regular Iranian Navy, IRGC started employing swarm tactics and surprise attacks using Boghammar speedboats fitted with rocket launchers, RPGs, and heavy machine guns. Attacks on Kuwaiti tankers, an Iraqi ally, eventually dragged the US Navy into the Persian Gulf to escort Kuwaiti tankers. As a response, IRGC ordered mining west of Farsi Island on the route of the very first caravan—the Kuwaiti supertanker SS Bridgeton escorted by four US warships—which successfully hit the tanker itself.

The 1988 naval battle between Iran and the US, Operation Praying Mantis, resulted in half of Iran’s operational fleet being destroyed or severely damaged. The US suffered 2 casualties due to an AH-1T Sea Cobra crashing. Iran lost 1 frigate (45 crew members killed), 1 gunboat (11 crew members killed), 3 speedboats, 1 frigate, and 2 platforms.

Engagements with the Royal Navy

On 21 June 2004, eight sailors and Royal Marines were seized by forces of the Revolutionary Guards' Navy while training Iraqi river patrol personnel in the Persian Gulf.
On 23 March 2007, fifteen sailors and Royal Marines from HMS Cornwall were seized by forces of the Revolutionary Guards' Navy in the Persian Gulf.

Engagements with the United States Navy

On 7 January 2008, US officials claimed five Iranian speedboats 'harassed' United States Navy vessels in the Persian Gulf. IRGC speedboats made threatening moves and in one case even came within 180 meters of US warships. The US Navy also claimed to have received a radio transmission from Iranian boats saying: "I am coming at you. You will explode in a couple of minutes". After this US ships were said to have taken up their gun positions and were ready to open fire at one of the boats when the Iranians turned away and one of the Iranian speedboats (allegedly) dropped white boxes into the water in front of the U.S. ships, it was not clear what was in the boxes.

Iranian officials and military commanders later downplayed the incidents as normal and denied having sent the radio transmission. After the US released a video showing Iranian speedboats swarming US ships in the Strait of Hormuz, Iran released its own video of the incident after suggesting the US video was staged.

On 12 January 2016, 10 American sailors were apprehended by IRGC officials off the coast of Farsi Island, which doubles as a naval installation for the IRGC.  American officials stated that the sailors were on a training mission when one of their boats experienced a mechanical failure. During this time the vessel drifted into Iranian territorial waters spurring IRGC naval units to respond and apprehend the sailors with both vessels.  US Secretary of State John Kerry engaged in a phone call with Iranian officials to defuse the situation.  Iranian officials said that the sailors were in custody, but would be freed within hours, understanding that the incident was a mistake.

In 2019, the IRGC Navy allegedly carried out a series of attacks on international vessels in the Gulf of Oman and seized vessels taking them to Iran.  As a result the United States started the International Maritime Security Construct (IMSC) which increases overall surveillance and security in key waterways in the Middle East, according to the Deputy Secretary of Defense Michael Mulroy.

Military doctrine and strategy

IRGC Navy and Artesh Navy overlap functions and areas of responsibility, but they are distinct in terms of how they are trained and equipped— and more importantly also in how they fight. The Revolutionary Guards Navy has a large inventory of small fast attack craft, and specializes in asymmetric hit-and-run tactics. It is more akin to a guerrilla force at sea, and maintains large arsenals of coastal defense and anti-ship cruise missiles and mines.

Janes recognizes the IRGCN as the resuscitator of fast inshore attack craft (FIAC) in the modern era, as well as the most prominent practitioner of "small boat swarm tactics that combine speed, mass, co-ordinated manoeuvre, low radar signature, and concealment" among naval forces of the world.

It has also a Takavar (special force) unit, called Sepah Navy Special Force (S.N.S.F.).

In 2022, the IRGCN had unveiled a new uniform ditching its usual green in favor of white.

Organization

Equipment

Current ships 
According to 'The Military Balance 2020' of the International Institute of Strategic Studies (IISS), the inventory includes:

Speedboat fleet 
In addition to the vessels mentioned above, IRGC operates a fleet of armed speedboats with displacement below 10 tonnes, the exact number of which is unknown. Back in 2007, the U.S. Office of Naval Intelligence estimated IRGC had a fleet of 1,000 speedboats that was growing. As of 2011, estimates ranged widely from "hundreds" to "several thousand". The number was put between 3,000 to 5,000 vessels according to most recent reports in 2020.

Classes of speedboats in the inventory include:
 Boghammar or Tareq class (IISS estimates 40 operational in 2020)
 Ashura class
 Cougar class
 FB class (RIB-33)
 Murce class
 Bahman class catamaran
 Gashti class
 Kuch class
 Bladerunner of Seraj class
  
 Meead class

Other vessels 
 Al-Sabehat, swimmer delivery vehicle
 Bavar 2, wing-in-ground effect air vehicle

Current aircraft 
Based on the IISS report, as of 2020 Iranian aircraft inventory includes:

Coastal anti-ship missiles
 Noor, based on the Chinese C-802 (+)
 Kowsar, based on the Chinese C-701 (+)
 Kowsar, based on the Chinese TL-10 (+)
 Nasr-1, based on the Chinese TL-6 (+)
 HY-2 Silkworm (+)
 Qader, medium-range anti-ship cruise missile
 Persian Gulf (Khalij Fars)  , Anti ship ballistic missile (ASBM) based on Fateh-110.

Torpedoes
Hoot, can be launched from IRGCN speedboats and torpedoboats

Commanders

See also

List of navies
List of marines and naval infantry forces

References

External links

Islamic Revolutionary Guard Corps military branches
1985 establishments in Iran
Navies by country
Marines
Military units and formations established in 1985